Andrew Jon Westerberg (born August 15, 1954) is an American politician in the state of Minnesota. He served in the Minnesota House of Representatives.

References

Republican Party members of the Minnesota House of Representatives
1954 births
Living people